The 2020 Michelin Pilot Challenge is the twenty-first season of the IMSA SportsCar Challenge and the seventh season organized by the International Motor Sports Association (IMSA).

Classes

 Grand Sport (GS) (run to FIA GT4 regulations)
 Touring Car (TCR)

Calendar

The 2020 schedule was released on 15 May 2020 and features ten rounds.

Entry list

Grand Sport

Touring Car

Race results
Bold indicates overall winner.

Championship standings

Points systems
Championship points are awarded in each class at the finish of each event. Points are awarded based on finishing positions as shown in the chart below.

Team points
Team points are calculated in exactly the same way as driver points, using the point distribution chart. Each car entered is considered its own "team" regardless if it is a single entry or part of a two-car team.

Team's Championships

Grand Sport

Touring Car

Manufacturer's Championships

Grand Sport

Touring Car

References

External links
 Official website

Michelin Pilot Challenge
Michelin Pilot Challenge
Michelin Pilot Challenge